Naracoorte Caves National Park is a national park near Naracoorte in the Limestone Coast tourism region in the south-east of South Australia (Australia). It was officially recognised in 1994 for its extensive fossil record when the site was inscribed on the World Heritage List, along with Riversleigh. The park preserves 6 km2 of remnant vegetation, with 26 caves contained within the 3.05 km2 World Heritage Area. Out of the 28 known caves in the park, only four are open to the public. Other caves are kept away from the public eye as they are important for scientific research and also for the protection of the caves and their contents. Many of the caves contain spectacular stalactites and stalagmites.

History

European discovery
The caves, which are located within the boundaries of what is now the national park, were first encountered in 1845 with the discovery of Blanche Cave.

Naracoorte Forest Reserve
In 1885, the Department of Woods and Forests appointed a caretaker due to "the popularity of the caves and their vulnerability to vandalism".

National Pleasure Resort
The change of control was gazetted on 1 Marchenfrwj 1917. The national pleasure resort's development into "an important regional tourist destination was greatly assisted by the discovery in 1969 in Victoria Cave of the largest known Australian Pleistocene vertebrate fossil cave deposit".

Conservation Park
On 27 April 1972, it was renamed as the  Naracoorte Caves Conservation Park upon the proclamation of the National Parks and Wildlife Act 1972 which repealed the former act along with other statutes concerned with conservation. In 1982, the conservation park was listed on the now-defunct Register of the National Estate.

World heritage listing

National Park
On 18 January 2001, the Naracoorte Caves Conservation Park was abolished and the land that it occupied was reconstituted as a national park because it was considered to be "of national significance by reason of the natural features of the land" and was assigned the name, Naracoorte Caves National Park.

National heritage listing
On 21 May 2007 The Australian Fossil Mammal Sites was one of 15 World Heritage places to be added to the Australian National Heritage List.

State heritage listing
On 17 May 2017, the extent of the national park was listed as a state heritage place on the South Australian Heritage Register with the name of the Naracoorte Caves Complex.

Visitor attraction

The park is a visitor destination in itself, with a camping ground and caravan park, dormitory accommodation for groups, picnic grounds and a licensed cafe. The range of visitor activities is extensive. Show cave tours are guided by professional interpreters through highly decorated caves with some tours visiting amazing fossil deposits. Modern technology has been utilised to show visitors the normally inaccessible interior of Bat Cave, where thousands of southern bent-wing bats breed each year. Other opportunities include adventure caving, a selection of specialty tours and special events. The Wonambi Fossil Centre, the park's visitor centre, features displays of fossils and bones found in the caves and dioramas of extinct animals.

Structure
The limestone of the area was formed from coral and marine creatures 200 million years ago and again 20 million years ago when the land was below sea level. Ground water since then has dissolved and eroded some of the limestone, creating the caves. The caves, such as the Victoria Fossil Cave and Blanche Cave, are often not far below ground, and holes open up creating traps for the unwary. This is the source of the remarkable collection of fossils. Mammals and other land creatures have fallen into open caves and been unable to escape. The fossil record has been preserved in strata formed from eroded topsoil washed and blown in. In some places, the fossil-bearing silt is up to 20 metres thick. Some of these areas are being preserved for future research when better methods of dating and reconstructing fossil records may have been found. These fossil traps are especially significant for tracing Australian megafauna.

The latest research pushes back the date of the caves' formation to at least 1.34 million years ago.

See also

 Protected areas of South Australia
 List of World Heritage Sites in Oceania
 List of fossil parks

References

Further reading
.

External links

 Official webpage
 World heritage listing for Naracoorte
 UNESCO site with information on Riversleigh, Australia
 Naracoorte Caves National Park webpage on protected planet
 Naracoorte Lucindale Tourism

National parks of South Australia
1916 establishments in Australia
Protected areas established in 1972
South Australian places listed on the defunct Register of the National Estate
World Heritage Sites in Australia
Australian National Heritage List
South Australian Heritage Register
Limestone Coast
Show caves in Australia
Paleontology in South Australia
Fossil museums
Fossil parks in Australia
Limestone caves
Natural history museums in Australia
Pleistocene paleontological sites of Australia
Museums in South Australia